Samosadka is a rural locality (a village) in Bakhtybayevsky Selsoviet, Birsky District, Bashkortostan, Russia. The population was 28 as of 2010. There are 6 streets.

Geography 
Samosadka is located 17 km north of Birsk (the district's administrative centre) by road. Vyazovsky is the nearest rural locality.

References 

Rural localities in Birsky District